
Gmina Zabrodzie is a rural gmina (administrative district) in Wyszków County, Masovian Voivodeship, in east-central Poland. Its seat is the village of Zabrodzie, which lies approximately 10 kilometres (6 mi) south-west of Wyszków and 42 km (26 mi) north-east of Warsaw.

Villages
Gmina Zabrodzie contains the villages and settlements of Adelin, Anastazew, Basinów, Choszczowe, Dębinki, Gaj, Głuchy, Karolinów, Kiciny, Lipiny, Młynarze, Mościska, Mostówka, Niegów, Obrąb, Płatków, Podgać, Przykory, Słopsk, Wysychy, Zabrodzie and Zazdrość.

Neighbouring gminas
Gmina Zabrodzie is bordered by the gminas of Dąbrówka, Jadów, Tłuszcz and Wyszków.

References

Polish official population figures 2006

Zabrodzie
Wyszków County